Argentina at the 1928 Summer Olympics in Amsterdam, Netherlands was the nation's fifth appearance out of eight editions of the Summer Olympic Games. Argentina sent to the 1928 Summer Olympics its second national team, under the auspices of the Argentine Olympic Committee (Comité Olímpico Argentino), 81 athletes (all males) that competed in 41 events in 12 sports. Argentina competed in equestrian, football, sailing, water polo, and wrestling for the first time. Argentina won 3 gold medals, its first Olympic championships in boxing (2 gold medals) and swimming. The team also won its first medals in fencing (a bronze) and football (a silver).

Medalists

Athletics

Five men competed for Argentina in athletics. It was the nation's second appearance in the sport. None of the athletes advanced to the final in any of their events; Kleger's 7th place finish in the hammer throw was the country's best result in the sport.

Men
Track & road events

Field events

Boxing

Eight men represented Argentina in boxing, the maximum allowed (one per weight class). It was the nation's third appearance in the sport. Avendaño and Rodríguez became the first Argentinian Olympic boxing champions.

Men

Cycling

Six cyclists, all men, represented Argentina in 1928. It was the nation's second appearance in the sport.

Road

Men

Track

Time trial

Sprint

Equestrian

Three horse and rider pairs competed for Argentina in equestrian events in 1928, all in the jumping competition. It was the nation's debut appearance in the sport. Del Villar was the best finisher for Argentina, at 34th place in the individual jumping. The sum of the individual scores was used for the team result; Argentina came in 12th among the 14 teams.

 Jumping

Fencing

Nine fencers, all men, represented Argentina in 1928. It was the nation's third appearance in the sport. They won the bronze medal in the team foil event, Argentina's first Olympic fencing medal.

Football

Argentina's Olympic football debut resulted in a silver medal.

Summary

 Men's tournament

 Team roster

 Round of 16

Quarterfinals

Semifinals

Gold medal match

Rowing

Nine men (an eights boat with coxswain) represented Argentina in rowing. It was the nation's second appearance in the sport. The Argentinian boat effectively placed 7th, not advancing to the third round.

Men

Sailing

Five sailors represented Argentina in 1928. It was the nation's debut in the sport.

Swimming

Four men represented Argentina in swimming in 1928. It was the nation's second appearance in the sport. Alberto Zorrilla competed in all three freestyle races, advancing to the final in each and taking gold in the middle distance. It was Argentina's first medal in swimming.

Men

Water polo

Argentina competed in Olympic water polo for the first time. They were defeated by Hungary 14–0 in the first round.

Summary

Men's tournament

Team roster

Round of 16

Weightlifting

Two men represented Argentina in weightlifting in 1928. It was the nation's second appearance in the sport.

Wrestling

Five men represented Argentina in wrestling in 1928. It was the nation's debut in the sport. Rey was the only Argentine wrestler to win a bout, though Walzer's bye in the second round of the middleweight competition actually gave the latter man a slightly better ranking than Rey.

Men's Greco-Roman

References

Nations at the 1928 Summer Olympics
1928
1928 in Argentine sport